Alexander Ransford Ababio is a Ghanaian politician and was the former member of parliament for the South Dayi constituency in the Volta region of Ghana in the first and second parliament of the 4th republic of Ghana.

Early life and education 
Alexander Ransford Ababio was born on 27 December 1927 in the Volta Region. He studied medicine at the Mission House College where he obtained his Bachelor of Science and after went to the University of Saarland and obtained his Doctor of Medicine.

Career 
He is a medical practitioner and a farmer by profession.

Politics 
Alexander Ransford Ababio was first elected into parliament in 1992 Ghanaian parliamentary election as member of the 1st parliament of the 4th republic of Ghana. He represented again the South Dayi constituency in the 2nd parliament of the 4th republic of Ghana in the 1996 Ghanaian general elections. He was elected on the ticket of the National Democratic Congress. He was the incumbent member of parliament who represented the constituency in the first parliament of the 4th republic of Ghana. Ababio lost his seat to Daniel K. Ampofo also of the National Democratic Congress in the subsequent elections of 2000.

Elections 
Ababio was elected with 12951votes out of 17626 valid votes cast representing 73.48% of the total valid votes cast. He was elected over Winfred Manfred Asimah an Independent who polled 2,397 votes representing 8.60% of the share, Barney Kodzo Agbo of the New Patriotic party (NPP) who polled 1,898 votes representing 6.80% of the share, and Akudeka Victor Kofi of the People's National Convention (PNC) who polled 380 votes representing 1.40% of the share.

Personal life 
He is a Christian.

References 

National Democratic Congress (Ghana) politicians
Ghanaian MPs 1997–2001
21st-century Ghanaian politicians
Ghanaian MPs 1993–1997
Ghanaian farmers
Saarland University alumni
Ghanaian Christians
Ghanaian medical doctors
People from Volta Region
1927 births
Living people